Marko Salminen (born 10 October 1978) is a Finnish rally co-driver. He is currently competing in the Junior World Rally Championship as the co-driver of Sami Pajari and in the Finnish Rally Championship alongside Teemu Asunmaa.

Rally career
Marko Salminen began his rally career in the 2008 Rally Sweden, co-driving for Jussi Tiippana in a Subaru Impreza STi N12.

Starting from 2019 season, Salminen partnered with Teemu Suninen in M-Sport Ford WRT. Before the season began, the Finnish crew made their debut cooperation in the 2018 Monza Rally Show, where they finished as the runner-up, just behind the MotoGP legend Valentino Rossi.

In Corsica, Salminen scored his first WRC points, finishing fifth overall. Only days before the start of Rally Sardinia 2019, Salminen was replaced as co-driver for Suninen in favour of the more experienced Jarmo Lehtinen.

He was a pilot of Sami Pajari in 2020 Junior WRC.

Rally results

WRC results

* Season still in progress.

References

External links
 Marko Salminen's e-wrc profile

1978 births
Living people
Finnish rally co-drivers
World Rally Championship co-drivers